This is a list of all stations of the Noida Metro, a rapid transit system serving Noida and Greater Noida in Uttar Pradesh. It was opened on 25 January 2019. There are a total of 21 metro stations.

Noida Metro is the 11th metro system in India. The first section of the Delhi Metro opened on 25 January 2019 with the Aqua Line. and has since been expanded to around 28 kilometers of route length as of 25 January 2019. The network has only one operational line and is built and operated by the Noida Metro Rail Corporation (NMRC).

Noida Sector 51 metro station offers an interchange with Delhi Metro.

For One year it will be operated by Delhi Metro Rail Corporation (DMRC), after that, it will be operated by Noida Metro Rail Corporation Limited (NMRC).

Metro stations

Statistics

See also 

List of Delhi Metro stations
List of Namma Metro stations
List of Kolkata Metro stations
List of Mumbai Metro stations
List of Jaipur Metro stations
List of Chennai metro stations
List of Lucknow Metro stations
List of Kochi Metro stations

References

External links 
NMRC Homepage

N
M